Joseph Mullin (May 29, 1848 in Watertown, Jefferson County, New York – September 1, 1897 in New York City) was an American lawyer and politician from New York.

Life
He was the son of Supreme Court Justice Joseph Mullin (1811–1882). He attended the public schools, and graduated from Rensselaer Polytechnic Institute in 1869. He was admitted to the bar, and practiced law in Watertown.

He was a delegate to the 1888 Republican National Convention.

He was a member of the New York State Senate from 1892 until his death in 1897, sitting in the 115th, 116th (both 21st D.), 117th, 118th (both 22nd D.), 119th and 120th (both 35th D.).

He died on September 1, 1897, in his bedroom at the University Club in New York City, of "heart disease", and was buried at the Brookside Cemetery in Watertown.

Sources
 The New York Red Book compiled by Edgar L. Murlin (published by James B. Lyon, Albany NY, 1897; pg. 404)
 Sketches of the members of the Legislature in The Evening Journal Almanac (1895; pg. 50)
 SENATOR MULLIN IS DEAD in NYT on September 3, 1897

External links

1848 births
1897 deaths
Republican Party New York (state) state senators
Politicians from Watertown, New York
Rensselaer Polytechnic Institute alumni
19th-century American politicians
Ten Eyck family